is a Japanese tennis player.

Ito has a career high ATP singles ranking of 325 achieved on 5 July 2010. He also has a career high ATP doubles ranking of 328, achieved on 8 July 2013. Ito has won 4 ITF singles titles and 11 ITF doubles titles.

Ito made his ATP main draw debut at the 2008 AIG Japan Open Tennis Championships, where he qualified for the singles draw.

ATP Challenger and ITF Futures finals

Singles: 8 (4–4)

Doubles: 38 (11–27)

References

External links 
 
 

1986 births
Living people
Japanese male tennis players
Sportspeople from Osaka
20th-century Japanese people
21st-century Japanese people